The Diocese of Kankan is a Latin Church ecclesiastical territory or diocese of the Catholic Church in Guinea. It is a suffragan diocese in the ecclesiastical province of the metropolitan Archdiocese of Conakry, yet depends on the missionary Roman Congregation for the Evangelization of Peoples.

Its cathedral is the Marian Cathédrale Notre-Dame des Victoires et de la Paix, dedicated to Our Lady of Victories and Peace, in the episcopal see of Kankan.

Statistics 
, it pastorally served 72,455 Catholics (3.4% of 2,143,000 total) on 118,000 km² in 14 parishes and 76 missions with 40 priests (32 diocesan, 8 religious), 23 lay religious (14 brothers, 9 sisters) and 7 seminarians.

History 
 Established on 12 May 1949 as Apostolic Prefecture of Kankan, on territory canonically split off from the Apostolic Vicariate of French Guinea
 Promoted on 17 November 1993 as Diocese of Kankan.

Bishops

Ordinaries 
Apostolic Prefects of Kankan  
 Father Maurizio Le Mailloux, Holy Ghost Fathers (C.S.Sp.- (1950.03.17 – death 1957)
Apostolic Administrator Gérard-Paul-Louis-Marie de Milleville, C.S.Sp. (1957 – 1958.12.14), while Metropolitan Archbishop of Conakry (Guinea) (1955.09.14 – retired 1962.03.10), later Titular Archbishop of Gabala (1962.03.10 – 2007.01.12) as Auxiliary Bishop of Fortaleza (Brazil) (1967 – 1984), Apostolic Administrator of Basse-Terre (Guadeloupe, French) (1968.01.29 – 1970.10.05); died 2207
 Fr. Jean B. Coudray, C.S.Sp. (1958.12.14 – death 1979)Apostolic Administrator Robert Sarah (1979 – 1993.11.17), while Metropolitan Archbishop of Conakry (Guinea) (1979.08.13 – 2001.10.01), President of Episcopal Conference of the Guinea (1985 – 2001); later Roman Curia official as Secretary of Congregation for the Evangelization of Peoples (2001.10.01 – 2010.10.07), Vice-Grand Chancellor of Pontifical Urbaniana University (2001.10.01 – 2010.10.07), President of Pontifical Council “Cor unum” (2010.10.07 – 2014.11.24), created Cardinal-Deacon of S. Giovanni Bosco in Via Tuscolana (2010.11.20 [2011.01.30] – ...), Prefect of Roman Congregation for Divine Worship and the Discipline of the Sacraments (2014.11.24 – ...)

Suffragan Bishops of Kankan 
 Vincent Coulibaly (1993.11.17 – 2003.05.06), first Guinean incumbent; later Metropolitan Archbishop of Conakry (Guinea) (2003.05.06 – ...), staying on shortly as Apostolic Administrator of Kankan (2003.07.31 – 2004), President of Episcopal Conference of the Guinea (2007.12 – 2013.01)
 Emmanuel Félémou (2007.01.05 - 2021.03.01), President of Episcopal Conference of the Guinea (2013.01 – 2018.05.11); no previous prelature.

Auxiliary Bishop
Alexis Aly Tagbino (2016-)

See also
 List of Catholic dioceses in Gabon
 Roman Catholicism in Gabon

Sources and external links 
 GCatholic.org, with Google satellite photo
 Catholic Hierarchy

Roman Catholic dioceses in Guinea
Kankan
Religious organizations established in 1949
Roman Catholic dioceses and prelatures established in the 20th century
1949 establishments in French Guinea